Trametes versicoloralso known as Coriolus versicolor and Polyporus versicoloris a common polypore mushroom found throughout the world. Meaning 'of several colors', versicolor reliably describes this fungus that displays a variety of colors. For example, because its shape and multiple colors are similar to those of a wild turkey, T. versicolor is commonly called turkey tail. A similar looking mushroom, commonly called false turkey tail, which is from a different order, may sometimes be confused with the turkey tail mushroom due to appearance. Another lookalike is the multicolor gill polypore.

Description and ecology
The top surface of the cap shows typical concentric zones of different colors, and the margin is always the lightest. Underneath a layer of tomentum is a black layer, topping the whitish flesh. The flesh itself is 1–3 mm thick and has a leathery texture. Older specimens, such as the one pictured, can have zones with green algae growing on them, thus appearing green. It commonly grows in tiled layers in groups or rows on logs and stumps of deciduous trees, and is common in North America. The mushroom is stalkless and the cap is rust-brown or darker brown, sometimes with black zones. The cap is flat, up to 8 × 5 x 0.5–1 cm in area. It is often triangular or round, with zones of fine hairs. The pore surface is whitish to light brown, with pores round and with age twisted and labyrinthine. 3–8 pores per millimeter. 

T. versicolor is a white-rot fungus which degrades lignin from lignocellulosic materials, such as wood. It may be eaten by caterpillars of the fungus moth Nemaxera betulinella, maggots of the Platypezid fly Polyporivora picta, and the fungus gnat Mycetophila luctuosa. It is considered inedible to humans.

Similar species 
Similar species include Trametes hirsuta, T. ochracea, T. suaveolens, Bjerkandera adusta, Cerrena unicolor, Lenzites betulina, and Stereum hirsutum. Other species of Stereum are similar, typically with a smooth undersurface, as well as some species of Trichaptum.

Chemistry
Trametes versicolor contains polysaccharides under basic research, including the protein-bound PSP and β-1,3 and β-1,4 glucans. The lipid fraction contains the lanostane-type tetracyclic triterpenoid sterol ergosta-7,22,dien-3β-ol as well as fungisterol and β-sitosterol. When extracting compounds from Trametes versicolor, methanol extractions have the highest levels of antioxidants, while water extractions have the most polyphenols and flavonoids.

Uses and research

Polysaccharide-K extract 

Polysaccharide-K (PSK or krestin), extracted from T. versicolor, is considered safe for use as an adjuvant therapy for cancer treatment in Japan where it is known as kawaratake (roof tile mushroom) and approved for clinical use. As a glycoprotein mixture, PSK has been studied in clinical research in people with various cancers and immune deficiencies, but its efficacy remains inconclusive, as of 2022.

In some countries, PSK is sold as a dietary supplement. Use of PSK may cause adverse effects, such as diarrhea, darkened feces, or darkened finger nails.

FDA warnings
In 2020, the United States Food and Drug Administration (FDA) issued warning letters to two manufacturers for advertising misbranded T. versicolor PSK supplements as anti-cancer or immune therapy drugs, stating such products "are not generally recognized as safe and effective for the above referenced uses and, therefore, these products are 'new drugs' under section 201(p) of the FD&C Act, 21 U.S.C. 321(p). New drugs may not be legally introduced or delivered for introduction into interstate commerce without prior approval from the FDA."

Trametes versicolor may be used in traditional Chinese medicine or other herbalism practices.

Gallery

See also
 List of Trametes species
 Polysaccharide-K
 Polysaccharide peptide
 Medicinal fungi

References

External links

 Trametes versicolor at Mushroom-Collecting.com

Fungi described in 1753
Fungi of Europe
Fungi of North America
Inedible fungi
Medicinal fungi
Polyporaceae
Taxa named by Carl Linnaeus